The 1990 season was Molde's 16th season in the top flight of Norwegian football. This season Molde competed in Tippeligaen and the Norwegian Cup.

In Tippeligaen, Molde finished in 3rd position, four points behind winners Rosenborg. 

Molde participated in the 1990 Norwegian Cup. They reached the fourth round where they were knocked out by Kongsvinger after losing 1–0 at away ground.

Squad
Source:

Friendlies

Competitions

Tippeligaen

Results summary

Positions by round

Results

League table

Norwegian Cup

Squad statistics

Appearances and goals
Lacking information:
Appearance statistics from Norwegian Cup rounds 1–4 (4–6 players in first round, 5–7 players in second round, 8–10 players in third round and 7–9 players in fourth round) are missing.

  
 
 

 

 
 
|}

Goalscorers

See also
Molde FK seasons

References

External links
nifs.no

1990
Molde